Kandhakottai  is a 2009 Indian Tamil-language action film directed by S. Sakthivel, starring Nakul and Poorna, whilst Sampath Raj and Santhanam play supporting roles. The music was composed by Dhina. The film released on 19 December 2009 to average reviews.

Plot
The film is about Siva, who hates love and those who are into such relationships, and even strives to separate couples. On the other hand, Pooja, a girl in Nagercoil, is the opposite of Siva, and takes risks to unite lovers. When Siva's sister Girija falls in love with Poorna's cousin, the two dissimilar characters meet. And when Siva sings Eppadi Ennul Kadhal Vandhadhu, they fall in love. But a man in Nagercoil kills himself when Pooja reveals that she is in love with Siva. Now his father Annachi is infuriated with the girl and murders her relatives. So Siva battles the baddies and marries Pooja.

Cast

Songs
Kandhakottai's soundtrack was composed by Dhina and features five songs. The soundtrack received mixed reviews. Actor Nakul had lent his voice for a song in the film.

Reviews
Oneindia said that "On whole, Kandha Kottai lacks substantiality in both narrative and technical aspects". Behindwoods wrote that "Kandha Kottai is an interesting concept which could have been sustained for the entire length of the film. But, commercialism and action take over in the second half, robbing the film of its main theme". A review in Sify stated, "On the whole Kandha Kottai is a typical masala entertainer that is made for the youth audiences. Have fun".

References

External links
 AGS Entertainment Website
 

2009 films
2000s Tamil-language films